Chantal Strand (born October 15, 1987) is a Canadian voice and stage actress as well as former stunt performer known for her vocal roles in animation, anime and video games.

Her vocal role credits include those for little female human characters in the Barbie films between 2001 and 2009, Holly in The Charlie Horse Music Pizza, Sarah's Sister in Life-Size, Cassie in Dragon Tales, Tammy in Air Bud: World Pup, Air Bud: Seventh Inning Fetch and Air Bud Spikes Back, Sophie in ToddWorld and Molly O in Generation O!.

Biography
At a young age, Strand started off doing stunts on Look Who's Talking Now with her twin sister, Michelle. Strand began working on many projects including The Outer Limits, The Commish, The Charlie Horse Music Pizza, Life-Size, Air Bud: World Pup, Air Bud: Seventh Inning Fetch  and Air Bud: Spikes Back throughout her elementary and high school years. In 2010, Strand graduated from Capilano University with an Associate of Arts degree and then transferred to the University of British Columbia, graduating in 2013 with a Bachelor of Arts degree. Strand completed a Master of Journalism degree at the University of British Columbia in 2016. She has published articles with The Tyee.

Career
Chantal provided various voice-over roles in such cartoon shows as Generation O, Dragon Tales, Hamtaro, and Sabrina: The Animated Series, in which she played the characters of Gem, Pi, and Bernard. She played Lacus Clyne in Gundam SEED, and Gundam SEED Destiny, in which she voiced both Lacus Clyne and Meer Campbell. After Lamb Chop's Play-Along came to an end Chantal was cast as Holly in the short-lived spin off The Charlie Horse Music Pizza starring  Shari Lewis and Lamb Chop. The Charlie Horse Music Pizza was canceled on August 3, 1998 after Shari died from uterine cancer and viral pneumonia.

Strand attended the 2002 Leo Awards when she was nominated for Best Supporting Performance in a Feature Length Drama. In June 2002, she received honours for contributing to the Emmy award-winning program The New Adventures of Madeline, going on to play the title character in two feature films. Strand was recently involved in My Little Pony: Friendship is Magic as the voice of Diamond Tiara and her mother, Spoiled Rich.

Filmography

Animation
 A Very Fairy Christmas (2006) - Leah Adams
 Barbie in the Nutcracker (2001) – Kelly
 Kelly Dream Club - Kelly
 Barbie as Rapunzel (2002) – Kelly, Princess Katrina
 Barbie of Swan Lake (2003) – Kelly the Cygnet
 Barbie and the Magic of Pegasus (2005) – Princess Kelly Rose
 Barbie in the 12 Dancing Princesses (2006) – Princess Lacey
 Barbie as the Island Princess (2007) – Sofia
 Barbie and the Diamond Castle (2008) – Stacie
 Bratz Fashion Pixiez (2007) – Breeana
 Bratz Babyz: The Movie (2006) – Nora
 Bratz Kidz Sleepover Adventure (2007) – Dana
 Care Bears: Adventures in Care-a-lot (2007) - McKenna
 Dinosaur Train – Valerie Velociraptor
 Dragon Tales – Cassie, Mother Rhyming Bird (episode, "Eggs Over Easy"), Blue Dragon with Red Badge (episode, "Four Little Pigs"), Jugglebug (episodes, "Quibbling Siblings", and "Sounds like Trouble") 
 Everything's Rosie - Rosie (US dub)
 Fat Dog Mendoza – Uncas
 Finley the Fire Engine (2001/2006) – Jesse the tow truck (US dub)
 Generation O! – Molly O!
 LoliRock - Shelby (episode, "Blurred Vision")
 My Fair Madeline – Madeline
 Madeline in Tahiti - Madeline
 Make Way For Noddy – Skittles
 The New Adventures of Madeline (2000) – Danielle, Yvette, Monique, Anne, Lulu and Celia
 My Little Pony (G3 videos) – Pink Sunsparkle, StarSong, Tiddlywink
 My Little Pony: Friendship is Magic – Diamond Tiara, Spectator No. 1 (episode, "One Bad Apple"), Spoiled Rich (episodes, "Crusaders of the Lost Mark", "Applejack's "Day" Off", and "Where the Apple Lies")
 Rainbow Fish – Sea Filly (TV series)
 RoboCop: Alpha Commando – Additional Voices
 Sabrina: The Animated Series – Gemini Stone, Pi, Bernard
 Superbook - Miriam (episode, "The Birth of Moses")
 Super Duper Sumos – Prima
 The Little Prince - Linea/Lenaya in "The Planet of Cublix"
 The Rainbow Fish - Little Blue Fish (Direct-to-video film) 
 The World of Piwi — Little Gelatos (1st voices)
 ToddWorld - Sophie
 Tom and Jerry: A Nutcracker Tale – Nibbles aka Tuffy Jerry's Ward
 Tom and Jerry Tales – Nibbles aka Tuffy Jerry's Ward (season 2)
 X-Men: Evolution – Wolfsbane

Anime
 Brain Powered – Akari Comodo
 Cardcaptors – Alex Mills (Episode 7), Anika (Episode 15)
 Dragon Drive – Sue
 Gintama° - Tama
 Gundam Seed – Lacus Clyne
 Gundam Seed Special Edition – Lacus Clyne
 Gundam Seed Destiny – Lacus Clyne, Meer Campbell
 Gundam Seed Destiny Special Edition – Lacus Clyne, Meer Campbell
 Gundam 00 – Feldt Grace
 Hamtaro – Bijou, Mia, Natalie
 Hikaru no Go – Akari Fujisaki
 Infinite Ryvius – Neeya
 Inuyasha – Mayu Ikeda, Asuka
 Junkers Come Here – Kazuko
 Mirmo! – Yurin
 Mix Master – Penril, Poy
 Njasok – Shizuka Kushini
 Let's Go Quintuplets – Vanessa, Bridget
 Little Astro Boy - Pikko
 Powerpuff Girls Z – Mandy, Duchess Morbucks
 Pucca – Ching
 Ranma ½ – Temari Kaminarimon
 Shakugan no Shana – Kazumi Yoshida (Season 1)
 The Story of Saiunkoku – Korin
 Tico of the Seven Seas - Nanami Simpson
 Tokyo Underground – Ruri Sarasa

Video games

Live action

Crew work
Look Who's Talking Now - Stunt performer

References

External links 
 Chantal Strand at IMDb
 
 Chantal Strand on Instagram
 Chantal Strand on Facebook
 Chantal Strand on Twitter
 Chantal Strand on Tumblr
 Chantal Strand at LinkedIn

1987 births
Living people
Actresses from Vancouver
Canadian child actresses
Canadian film actresses
Canadian stunt performers
Canadian television actresses
Canadian video game actresses
Canadian voice actresses
Capilano University alumni
University of British Columbia alumni
Women stunt performers
20th-century Canadian actresses
21st-century Canadian actresses